Passiflora mixta, from the family Passifloraceae is also known as curuba, curuba de indio, curuba de monte, curubita, curuba (Colombia), parcha (Venezuela), and taxo (Ecuador). Originally, it derived from the monophyletic Passiflora subgenus Tacsonia. Passiflora mixta is endemic to the Americas. A perennial vine, the Passiflora mixta is pink to orange-red in color.

Description 

Passiflora mixta can be identified by large pink flowers, trilobate coricaeous leaves, that are tubular in shape that protrude from its branches. It has a hairy elongated bract and hypanthum that contain a narrow nector chamber. At , Passiflora mixta has a hypanthium (otherwise known as the flower tube) with a base that contains nectar. Also found in P. mixta, are ovaries, anthers and stigmas. These reproductive organs are located anterior to the hypanthium near the androgynophore. This species is capable of producing fruits and flowers that remain open for 3 to 5 days by producing half-pendant, horizontal, or erect flowers.
 
Status:
Wild plant, collected, important genetic resource for banana passionfruit breeding.

Morphology 
 Stem- Sub 5-angular
 Leaf Pubescence- Not present on the upper surface; however, missing to seldom dense on the lower surface
 Stipules- Moderate to big in size, 6–20 mm in length, 12–30 mm wide, reniform, dentate or serrate, persistent
 Peduncle- robust, length varies. Produces half-pendent, horizontal, or erect flowers.
 Bracts- Joined 1/2 their length or beyond
 Corolla Color- Pale pink to intense red
 Corolla Shape- Corolla campanulate
 Floral Tube/Sepal Ratio- 1.6-2.6
 Nectary Chamber- Slightly broader than the floral tube
 Fruits- At maturity, the pericarp often appears green, occasionally turning yellow; arils scarce and grey to orange in color,

Pollination 
This species of Passiflora is pollinated by the Sword-billed hummingbird (Ensifera ensifera), which is the only living species in the genus Ensifera. This bird is found throughout the northern Andes and is identified by its extremely large beak that is longer than the size of its entire body. They are pollinators of the passionflower, which contains nectar at the bottom of the long corolla tube that belongs to the P. mixta.

Distribution 
 Ranges from Venezuela to Bolivia 
 Naturalized in Africa and New Zealand
 Restricted to the highland between  asl.
 Can withstand disturbances and is more prominent in dryer environment and lower altitudes compared to other species of subgenus Tacsonia
 Grows along the edges of forests and along the margins

References 

mixta
Flora of South America
Plants described in 1782